Lahuji Raghoji Salve (14 November 1794 – 17 February 1881), was an Indian Hindu social reformer and Dalit activist.

Early life

He was born into Mang community near Purandar in the Maharashtra state of India. Lahuji is also referred to as "Lahujibuwa Mang" and his father was Raghoji Salve and mother Vithabai. He was the Mang mentor of the Vasudev Balwant Phadke, father of Indian Armed Revolution. 

He learnt wrestling from his father and he became an expert wrestler, which eventually earned him the title of 'Vastad' (or master) and he also owned a gymnasium at Ganj peth in Pune. The Birthday of Lahuji is celebrated as 'Rashtriya Swatantrya Sankalp Divas' throughout India.

Movement
Lahuji also taught martial arts to many reknowed people Some of the most prominent revolutionaries of that time visited the gymnasium notably Jyotiba Phule, Bal Gangadhar Tilak, Vasudev Balwant Phadke, Sadashivrao Paranjpe, Moro Vithal Walvekar. Lahuji not only taught them martial arts but also acted as a mentor preaching the need for Indian freedom from British Raj and the upliftment of Untouchables. Lahuji got acquainted with Jyotirao Phule's work for the liberation of depressed classes by educating them and joined his Satyashodhak Samaj.

It was upon the muscle and strength of Lahuji that Phule fronted all the physical attacks that were hurled at him and his wife, Savitri. He had mastery and skill in a special weapon called  dandpatta. He helped recruit many Dalit students for the Phule schools. Phule's adoration of Lahuji and salutations appear in the records and reports to the British government.

Krantiveer Lahuji Vastad Salve (Aadya_krantikarak) Memorial at Sangamwadi in Pune is also under construction.

References

Satyashodhak Samaj
1781 births
1881 deaths
Indian independence activists from Maharashtra
Indian revolutionaries